The 2018 Arkansas gubernatorial election was held on November 6, 2018, to elect the Governor of Arkansas, concurrently with elections to the United States Senate in other states, elections to the United States House of Representatives, and various state and local elections. Incumbent Republican Governor Asa Hutchinson won reelection to a second term, winning by more than 33 percentage points and carrying all but seven counties, marking the largest winning margin of any Republican gubernatorial candidate in Arkansas history.

Republican primary

Candidates

Declared
 Asa Hutchinson, incumbent Governor
 Jan Morgan, gun range owner

Declined
 Tim Griffin, Lieutenant Governor and former U.S. Representative (running for re-election)
 Leslie Rutledge, Attorney General (running for re-election)
 John Thurston, Land Commissioner (running for Secretary of State)

Endorsements

Polling

Results

Democratic primary

Candidates

Declared
 Jared Henderson, former Arkansas executive director of Teach For America
 Leticia Sanders, hairdresser

Declined
 Keith Ingram, Minority Leader of the Arkansas Senate
 Jay Martin, former Majority Leader of the Arkansas House of Representatives

Results

Independents

Candidates

Declined
 Bobby Bones, radio host

Libertarian primary

Candidates

Declared
 Mark West (Libertarian), pastor and nominee for AR-01 in 2016

General election

Predictions

Debates

Polling

Results

See also
2018 Arkansas elections

References

External links
Candidates at Vote Smart 
Candidates at Ballotpedia

Official campaign websites
 Jared Henderson (D) for Governor
 Asa Hutchinson (R) for Governor
 Mark West (L) for Governor

Arkansas
Gubernatorial
2018